Admiral Sir Hubert George Brand,  (20 May 1870 – 14 December 1955) was a senior Royal Navy officer who served as Second Sea Lord and Chief of Naval Personnel.

Background
Brand was the second son of Henry Brand, 2nd Viscount Hampden, Governor of New South Wales, and the grandson of Henry Brand, 1st Viscount Hampden, Speaker of the House of Commons. His mother was Susan Henrietta Cavendish, daughter of Lord George Cavendish. His three surviving brothers also gained distinction: Thomas Brand, 3rd Viscount Hampden, and the Honourable Roger Brand were both Brigadier-Generals in the Army while the Honourable Robert Brand was a businessman and civil servant who was raised to the peerage as Baron Brand in 1946.

Naval career
Brand joined the Royal Navy in 1883. Appointed acting Sub-Lieutenant on 14 September 1889, he was confirmed in this rank in June 1891, and promoted to Lieutenant on 30 June 1892. He was promoted to Commander on 1 September 1902, and appointed in command of the destroyer HMS Success on 20 December 1902, but transferred to take command of the newly commissioned HMS Arab only three weeks later on 12 January 1903.

He was appointed Naval Attaché in Tokyo in 1912. He served in World War I as Naval Assistant to the Second Sea Lord and then as Chief of Staff to Admiral commanding the Battlecruiser Squadron from 1916. On 26 June 1919, he was appointed a deputy lieutenant of Hertfordshire. After the war he became commander of the King's Yachts from 1919 and then commanded the 1st Light Cruiser Squadron from 1922 before becoming Naval Secretary in 1925. He went on to be Second Sea Lord and Chief of Naval Personnel later that year. He was made Commander-in-Chief, Atlantic Fleet in 1927 and Commander-in-Chief, Plymouth in 1929. He was also appointed First and Principal Naval Aide-de-Camp to the King in 1931; He retired in 1932.

Family
Brand married Norah Greene, daughter of Sir Conyngham Greene, British Ambassador to Japan, in 1914. They had two daughters, of whom only the eldest reached adulthood. Norah died in March 1924. Brand remained a widower until his death in December 1955, aged 85.

References

|-

|-

|-

|-

|-

1870 births
1955 deaths
British naval attachés
Royal Navy officers of World War I
Royal Navy admirals
Knights Grand Cross of the Order of the Bath
Knights Commander of the Order of St Michael and St George
Knights Commander of the Royal Victorian Order
Younger sons of viscounts
Lords of the Admiralty
Deputy Lieutenants of Hertfordshire